Fernando Ortuño Blasco (12 October 1945 – 13 July 2015) was a Spanish footballer. He competed in the men's tournament at the 1968 Summer Olympics.

References

External links
 
 

1945 births
2015 deaths
Spanish footballers
Olympic footballers of Spain
Footballers at the 1968 Summer Olympics
Footballers from Granollers
Association football forwards
Real Madrid CF players
CE Sabadell FC footballers
CD Castellón footballers
La Liga players
Segunda División players
Catalonia international footballers